Harry Burton was an English professional rugby league footballer who played in the 1950s.

Playing career

First Televised Try
Harry Burton scored the first try when rugby league was first televised live, when Wakefield Trinity played Wigan at Central Park on Saturday 12 January 1952.

Club career
Harry Burton made his début for Wakefield Trinity during September 1950, he appears to have scored no drop-goals (or field-goals as they are currently known in Australasia), but prior to the 1974–75 season all goals, whether; conversions, penalties, or drop-goals, scored 2-points, consequently prior to this date drop-goals were often not explicitly documented, therefore '0' drop-goals may indicate drop-goals not recorded, rather than no drop-goals scored.

References

External links
Search for "Burton" at rugbyleagueproject.org

Johnny Bullock & Harry Burton pass away
Obituary - Wakefield Express

2009 deaths
English rugby league players
Place of death missing
Rugby league centres
Rugby league players from Castleford
Wakefield Trinity players
Year of birth missing